German submarine U-251 was a Type VIIC U-boat of Nazi Germany's Kriegsmarine during World War II. The submarine was laid down on 18 October 1940 at the Bremer-Vulkan-Vegesacker Werft (yard) in Bremen as yard number 16, launched on 26 July 1941 and commissioned on 20 September under the command of Kapitänleutnant Heinrich Timm.

She was a member of three wolfpacks.

She was sunk by British and Norwegian aircraft in the Kattegat on 19 April 1945.

Design
German Type VIIC submarines were preceded by the shorter Type VIIB submarines. U-251 had a displacement of  when at the surface and  while submerged. She had two shafts and two  propellers.

U-251 was fitted with five  torpedo tubes (four fitted at the bow and one at the stern), fourteen torpedoes, one  SK C/35 naval gun, 220 rounds, and two twin  C/30 anti-aircraft guns. The boat had a complement of between forty-four and sixty.

Service history
After training with the 6th U-boat Flotilla, she became operational on 1 May 1942. U-245 was transferred to the 11th flotilla on 1 July and the 13th flotilla on 1 June 1943. There followed spells with the 24th, 21st and 31st flotillas, (see infobox for dates).

First patrol
The boat's first patrol was preceded by a short trip between Kiel and Kristiansand in Norway. Her first sortie proper began with her departure from Kristiansand on 20 April 1942. The second part of this patrol was marked by sinking the Jutland south of Bear Island on 3 May after the ship had been hit by bombs from German aircraft. She then made three forays from Kirkenes, Skjomenfjord and Trondheim over the rest of May.

Second patrol
Her second patrol was also in May and covered the eastern Norwegian Sea.

Third patrol
The submarine sank the El Capitan on 17 July 1942 near northeast Iceland. This ship was with Convoy PQ 17 before being attacked by Luftwaffe Ju 88s. The ship had been abandoned; U-251 finished her off.

For the rest of her career, the U-boat patrolled northern waters; at one time steaming as far north and east as Novaya Zemlya in the Kara Sea.

Tenth patrol and loss
By the time of her tenth sortie, the Allies dominated the air. This situation was dramatically demonstrated when the boat was sunk by rockets from no less than eight British and Norwegian Mosquitos of 143, 235 and 248 squadrons in the Kattegat on 19 April 1945.

Thirty-nine men died; there were four survivors.

Wolfpacks
U-251 took part in three wolfpacks, namely:
 Strauchritter (29 April – 5 May 1942) 
 Eisteufel (21 June – 12 July 1942) 
 Eisbär (27 March – 15 April 1943)

Summary of raiding history

References

Bibliography

External links

World War II submarines of Germany
German Type VIIC submarines
U-boats commissioned in 1941
1941 ships
Ships built in Bremen (state)
U-boats sunk by British aircraft
U-boats sunk by Norwegian aircraft
World War II shipwrecks in the Kattegat
U-boats sunk in 1945
Maritime incidents in April 1945